The Nokia 500 is an entry level Symbian Belle smartphone. It was first released on 1 August 2011, with all models available by the end of the year. It comes upgraded to Nokia Belle after 15 February 2012 onwards (previously known as "Symbian Belle") via Nokia Suite and over-the-air (some country variants) 
The Nokia 500 has had many problems since it was first released with firmware version 010.029, but it runs smoothly after the 11.33 update. Instead of an OpenGL ES GPU, the 500 features a simpler OpenVG GPU, so, even though 3D apps work without hardware acceleration, some 2D and vector apps, like Angry Birds, work correctly. The "Nokia Belle" update (latest software release is version 111.021.0028) improved performance with less latency and a new interface.

Features (Nokia Belle OS)
The Nokia 500 comes with pre-loaded Angry Birds app. Belle features up to four home screens with live widgets in different sizes. Home screens can be personalised with home screen widgets and shortcuts, including notifications and connectivity options. The lock screen can be customised with wallpapers and important information. Apps are available for navigation, imaging, and browsing the web.

References

External links 
 
 "Nokia 500 specs on GSMArena site"
 "Nokia India web-site"
 "Official Nokia 500 specs"

Nokia smartphones
Symbian devices
Mobile phones with user-replaceable battery
Mobile phones introduced in 2011